Michael Delaney (born December 2, 1942) is an American college football coach, and a former head coach at the University of Montana. Delaney was hired July 26, 2012, replacing former head coach Robin Pflugrad. Delaney is credited for coming out of retirement to help save the UM football program that was riveted with player off field scandals. <ref>{{Cite web |url=http://www.gogriz.com/sports/m-footbl/mtt/delaney_mick00.html |title="/> 

Delaney has had extensive coaching experience. He was the assistant head coach at Montana State University from 1976–1980, head coach and athletic director at the University of Montana Western from 1991–1992, and running backs coach at Colorado State University from 1993 until 2007.

Coaching career
Delaney is originally from Butte, Montana. He began his coaching career at Butte Central High School (1964–1967), and then moved on to Great Falls High School (1969–1977), serving as head football coach the last four years.

He earned his B.A. in education at University of Montana Western in 1964. He is an inaugural inductee into the Western Montana College Sports Hall of Fame.

Prior to coaching the Rams, Delaney was the head coach at Western Montana in 1991 and 1992; was the athletic director at Montana Tech of the University of Montana (1983–85); and was an assistant football coach at Montana State (1976–80). He came to Montana from Colorado State where he was an assistant coach for former head coach Sonny Lubick for 15 seasons from 1993–2007.

Head coaching record

References

1942 births
Living people
Colorado State Rams football coaches
High school football coaches in Montana
Montana Grizzlies football coaches
Montana State Bobcats football coaches
Montana Western Bulldogs football coaches
Sportspeople from Butte, Montana